Sir Henry Taylor  (18 October 1800 – 27 March 1886) was an English dramatist and poet, Colonial Office official, and man of letters.

Early life
Henry Taylor was born on 18 October 1800 in Bishop Middleham. He was the third son of George Taylor Sr and Eleanor Ashworth, who died when he was an infant. His father remarried Jane Mills in 1818, and the family then moved to Witton-le-Wear. George Taylor Sr's friend Charles Arbuthnot found vocational positions in London for Henry Taylor and his elder brother, George Taylor Jr. In 1817, the pair along with their second brother, William, a medical student, went to London. Soon afterwards, all three siblings contracted typhus fever, and both his brothers died within a fortnight. 

Following this tragedy, Henry Taylor then accepted work in the Colonial administration of Barbados. Taylor's place in Barbados was abolished in 1820, subsequent to which he returned to his father's house.

At the Colonial Office
Taylor obtained a clerkship in the Colonial Office, where he subsequently worked from 1824 until 1872, through Henry Holland. In this position Taylor served under the permanent secretary Robert William Hay. Taylor was appointed a Knight Commander of the Order of St Michael and St George (KCMG) in the 1869 Birthday Honours.

Hay's successors included James Stephen, Herman Merivale and Frederic Rogers. Hay, Stephen, Taylor and James Spedding, who also worked in the Office, each proposed reform. During the 1830s, Taylor and Stephen endorsed the abolitionist contentions of Viscount Howick, as a consequence of which Stephen replaced Hay.

Taylor died on 27 March 1886.

Literary connections

Taylor wrote Byronic poems and an article on Thomas Moore, which in 1822 was accepted for the Quarterly Review by William Gifford. Returning to London in October 1823, he found that Gifford had printed another article of his, on Lord John Russell. Taylor had also contributed to the London Magazine, and had an offer of the editorship.

His father George was a friend of William Wordsworth. In 1823, on a visit to the Lake District, Henry Taylor made the acquaintance of Robert Southey, and they became friends. Jane Taylor had a first cousin, Isabella Fenwick (1783–1856), whom he introduced to the Wordsworth family. She became a close friend of Wordsworth in later life, as she had been of Taylor up to the time of his marriage. Though Fenwick was not herself a writer, her friendship left an enduring impression on the writings of Taylor and Wordsworth. In his autobiography, Henry Taylor wrote, “There is a good deal of her mind in my writings. I wish there was more; and I wish that she had left her thoughts behind her in writings of her own.” 

Taylor's work also brought him literary friends: the circle of Thomas Hyde Villiers, and his colleague James Stephen. Through Villiers he became acquainted with Charles Austin, John Stuart Mill, and some of the Benthamites. He made speeches in opposition to their views, in the debating society documented by Mill. He also invited them to personal meetings with Wordsworth and Southey. Mill introduced Taylor to Thomas Carlyle in November 1831, initiating a long friendship. Carlyle's opinion of the "marked veracity" of Taylor was printed wrongly by the editor James Anthony Froude as "morbid vivacity". He also knew John Sterling, and made the acquaintance of Fanny Trollope whilst attending the court of Louis Philippe of France.

Taylor aspired to become the official biographer of Southey. The family row over Southey's second marriage, to Caroline Anne Bowles, found him with the Wordsworths and others hostile to Bowles. He did become Southey's literary executor.

Works
In Witton, Taylor wrote The Cave of Ceada which was accepted for the Quarterly Review.  Taylor wrote a number of plays, including Isaac Comnenus (1827), and Philip van Artevelde (1834). This latter brought him fame and elicited comparisons with Shakespeare. In 1845 there followed a book of lyrical poems. His essay The Statesman (1836) caused some controversy, as a "supposedly" satirical view of how the civil service worked.

Taylor published his Autobiography in 1885, which contains portraits of Wordsworth, Southey, Tennyson and Walter Scott. In it, on his own account, he gave Richard Whately's opinion of him as a "resuscitated Bacon", who had better things to do than write verse (which could be left to women).

His poem Edwin the Fair depicted Charles Elliot as Earl Athulf. Thomas Frederick Elliot, Charles's brother, was a Colonial Office colleague.

Literary reputation
In his own time, Taylor was highly esteemed as a poet and dramatist.  For example, J.G. Lockhart claimed that Philip Van Artevelde secured Taylor "a place among the real artists of his time", and, as late as 1868, J.H. Stirling ranked Philip higher than anything produced by Robert Browning.

Modern literary historians, however, tend to overlook Taylor's accomplishments in verse and drama and emphasize his importance as a literary critic, pointing out that he was a strong advocate for stylistic simplicity, subject matter rooted in common life, and intellectual discipline in poetic composition, placing special importance on clear and reasoned structure.

Marriage and family
Taylor married Hon. Theodosia Alice Spring Rice, daughter of Thomas Spring Rice, 1st Baron Monteagle of Brandon, on 17 October 1839. They had five children, including the biographer Ida Alice Ashworth Taylor.

Sources

Selected bibliography

Plays

Poems

Chapters in books 
 
Also available as:  Preview.

Essays 
  With an Appendix containing the original Advertisements, and the Prefatory Letter on Music.
  
 
Originally published as:  Preview.
  Available online.
Money / Humility & independence / Wisdom / Choice in marriage / Children / The life poetic
  
Wordsworth's letter to Henry Taylor regarding the essay: 
The essay:

References

External links
 
 
 

1800 births
1886 deaths
English dramatists and playwrights
Knights Commander of the Order of St Michael and St George
English male dramatists and playwrights
19th-century British dramatists and playwrights
19th-century male writers
People from Bishop Middleham
People from Witton-le-Wear